D'Angelo (born 1974) is an American musician.

D'Angelo may also refer to:

People with the name
D'Angelo (surname)
D'Angelo Dinero (born 1978), ring name of American professional wrestler Elijah Burke
D'Angelo Jiménez (born 1977), Dominican-born Major League Baseball player
D'Angelo Russell (born 1996), American NBA Player
D'Angelo Wallace, American YouTuber

Other uses
D'Angelo Barksdale, fictional character in the HBO drama The Wire
D'Angelo Grilled Sandwiches, American sandwich restaurant chain

See also
DeAngelo (disambiguation)